The New South Wales Department of Enterprise, Investment and Trade, a department of the government of New South Wales, delivers services that promote enterprise, investment, trade, hospitality, racing, arts, tourism and sport in the state of New South Wales, Australia. The Department is the lead agency of the Enterprise, Investment and Trade cluster of the NSW government.

The Department was formed on 21 December 2021 following the second arrangement of the Perrottet ministry.

Governing legislation

Structure 
The Department is the lead agency in the Enterprise, Investment and Trade cluster, led by secretary, presently Elizabeth Mildwater since October 2022. The Group Deputy Secretary of Tourism, Sport and Arts within the department is presently Kate Foy.

The incumbent secretary was Amy Brown, who was appointed in January 2022 and was the CEO of Investment NSW. Brown was sacked in September that year due to her role in the John Barilaro saga as CEO of Investment NSW. Mildwater was acting Secretary for a month until she was officially appointed in October.

Ministers 
The following ministers are responsible for the administration of the department and its agencies:
 Minister for Enterprise, Investment and Trade, Minister for Sport, Minister for Science, Innovation and Technology, presently the Hon. Alister Henskens 
 Minister for Hospitality and Racing, presently the Hon. Kevin Anderson 
 Minister for Tourism, Minister for the Arts, presently the Hon. Ben Franklin 
 Minister for Western Sydney, presently the Hon. David Elliott 

All ministers (except Elliott) were appointed with effect from 21 December 2021, with a ministerial change on 5 August 2022. This expanded the portfolios of Henskens to include Minister for Enterprise, Investment and Trade, and Minister for Sport, Franklin to include Minister for Tourism, and the appointment of Elliott as Minister for Western Sydney.

Agencies administered 
The following agencies are administered by the Department, classified by groups:

 Enterprise, Investment and Trade and Science, Innovation and Technology
 Investment NSW (formerly a stand-alone agency)
 Hospitality and racing
 Liquor & Gaming NSW
 Office of Racing keyboard
 Office of Responsible Gambling
 Independent Liquor and Gaming Authority
 Office of the Greyhound Welfare and Integrity Commission
 Culture and tourism
 Art Gallery of New South Wales
 Australian Museum
 Create NSW
 Destination NSW
 State Library of New South Wales
 Museum of Applied Arts & Sciences
 State Archives and Records Authority of NSW
 Sydney Opera House
 Sydney Living Museums
 Sport
 New South Wales Institute of Sport
 Office of Sport
 Venues NSW
 Western Parkland Authority
 Western Parkland City Authority

See also

List of New South Wales government agencies

References

External links

Enterprise, Investment and Trade
2021 establishments in Australia
Investment and trade
New South Wales